Konstantin Dimopoulos (born December 20, 1954) is a social and environmental artist whose art practice is grounded in his sociological and humanist philosophies. He investigates globally relevant questions related to ecology and the human condition through his socio-environmental interventions and conceptual proposals, which argue for the potential of art as a means of social engagement and change. He is known for large public kinetic sculpture, The Blue Tree - an art installation about deforestation and Purple Rain - a textual and visual response to homelessness.

Early life 

Konstantin Dimopoulos was born in Port Said, Egypt to Greek parents and grew up at the mouth of the Suez Canal until the age of eight, when the family moved to Wellington, New Zealand to escape a political upheaval. With this diverse cultural and political history, the artist has created art interventions on issues including emigration, environmental ecocide, homelessness, and genocide.

Career 
The powerful and often thought provoking art-making practices of Konstantin Dimopoulos have attracted international attention. The artist investigates globally relevant questions related to ecology and the human condition, presented in temporary installations at public galleries, museums and outdoor sites throughout Australia and New Zealand, the United States, North America, Europe and Japan. His sculptures can be found in public spaces and private collections. Paintings, drawings and prints complement the spatial works.

Dimopoulos's first exhibition was in 1981, The Passioned, a series of "large, lively and bold linear oil paintings". The exhibition was followed by a second solo show before he travelled to London and Europe.
On returning to Wellington Dimopoulos created works for his 1989 exhibition Mind at the End of Its Tether, a series of dark, figurative oil paintings about the men working in the printing room of Wellington's daily newspaper. "The artist created large canvases that were brutal but beautiful statements of man's survival in sterile and hostile places. Superimposed on a pastiche of crumble-textured surfaces, with the materialising bodies all but lost in the polluted white-on-colour of industrial eternity."

Dimopoulos has exhibited nationally and internationally since 1981, including representation by the Conny Dietzschold Gallery in Sydney and exhibitions at the art fairs of Cologne, Auckland and Melbourne. Honors include the inaugural Civic Initiative Award for Sculpture of Wellington (2002) and the Kinetic Art Organisation International Award for Public Kinetic Sculpture (2004). The Blue Trees was named as one of the Top 100 Activism Trends (2012) for ideas that change the world, and was a finalist for the global Index: Design to Improve Life (2013) and the British Climate Week (2014) awards.

Sculptures and public art 
In the 1990s Dimopoulos began to explore the dynamics of form through the medium of sculpture. Beginning with his early works Dimopoulos experimented with the repetition of individual elements. Flexible shafts of carbon fibre became his new material of choice for purely linear, abstract kinetic sculptures that interact with the wind. His pared-down colour palette led to vivid colour choices in primarily monochromatic applications, also visible in the large-scale steel sculptures.

In 2001 he was commissioned by the Wellington Sculpture Trust to create "Pacific Grass", the first in the Meridian Energy Wind Sculpture Walk series. "Pacific Grass transforms a traffic island into a beacon of vertical bands of colour that undulate and pulsate with each gust of wind. Its resin rods harness and respond to the extremes of this site, making Pacific Grass memorable as it ushers the traffic around the circumference of the roundabout."

In 2004 Dimopoulos was invited to create the sculpture Kete for Connells Bay Centre for Sculpture on Waiheke Island, New Zealand. This was followed in 2005 by Red Ridge, a monumental sculpture for a private golf course in Arrowtown, New Zealand. Red Ridge caused controversy when the property owner had the work installed without first obtaining local government consent. In downtown Melbourne, Australia's busy  Federation Square he installed Red Centre in 2006.
 
Dimopoulos has created sculptures for public and private collections in Australia, New Zealand, the United States and United Arab Emirates. Public art commissions in the United States include "Red Echo" (2010) in Palm Springs, California (2010), "Red Stix" at Home Plate Plaza, Seattle, Washington (2012), "Golden Field" at the Jean Oxley Public Service Center in Cedar Rapids, Iowa (2012) and 'BLUE", at a private residential complex in Casa Mira, San Diego, California (2014). The Red Forest in Denver, USA was voted Westwords Best New Public Art 2011. "RED" was installed in the Middle East in Abu Dhabi, United Arab Emirates (2010).

 The Blue Trees 

The Blue Trees, an ongoing environmental art installation about deforestation where the artist uses a vibrant blue to temporarily transform living trees into a surreal environment Dimopoulos sees his The Blue Trees as an ephemeral performance art installation using transformation to provoke discussion about the issue of global deforestation. The Blue Trees is an ongoing project and has been realised in partnership with cultural and environmental organisations, cities and hundreds of volunteers. Stands of trees, either mature or saplings, are coloured with an environmentally safe, ultramarine blue pigment to call attention to global deforestation.Chronology of The Blue Trees'
2018 Currier Museum of Art, Manchester, NH USA

2016 Jacksonville Zoo, Jacksonville, FL USA

2015 Kuenzelsau Environment Installation at ZIEHL-ABEGG, Germany

2015 Vancouver Biennale, Canada

2013 City of London Festival, England

2013 Houston, Texas USA

2013 Atlanta, Georgia USA

2013 Albuquerque, New Mexico USA

2012 Sacramento, California USA

2012 Florida University, Gainesville, Florida USA

2012 Westlake Park, Seattle, Washington USA, and The Burke Gilman Trail, Kenmore, Washington USA

2011 Brick Bay Sculpture Trail, New Zealand

2011 Vancouver Biennale, Canada
 
2005 Sacred Grove – The Blue Forest, Afforestation Art Action, Melbourne, Australia

2916

Installation art 
Installations at public gallery and museum venues explore the state of contemporary civilisation in a global society. In New Zealand, Dimopoulos installed "Kroc and the Creation of the Big Byte" (The Physics Room, Christchurch 1997) in a visual essay that profiled the development of the McDonald's corporate image. "Level 4 – environmental ecocide" (Rotorua Museum of Art, 1997 and Manawatu Art Gallery, Palmerston North 1998) related to the highest degree of laboratory containment for experimenting with micro-biological organisms. "Works from a Savage Garden – environmental ecocide" (Suter Art Gallery, Nelson 1999) investigated the identity of a geographical virus by interpolating a correlation between humanity and gorse, a thorny invasive plant.

Installations in Australia highlighted cultural appropriation, realised in "Black Parthenon", an installation on cultural appropriation, presented 2009 as part of the Melbourne Festival of Light (Federation Square, Melbourne 2009). Birdcloud (Busan Biennale, Korea 2013) referenced the importance of social media within the context of global uprisings. 

The Purple Rain is a textual and visual response to homelessness; and his light works continue this thematic exploration of social issues using a commercial advertising medium.

References

External links 
Konstantin Dimopoulos
The Wellington Sculpture Trust

20th-century Australian sculptors
21st-century Australian sculptors
1954 births
Living people
20th-century New Zealand sculptors
20th-century New Zealand male artists
21st-century New Zealand sculptors
21st-century New Zealand male artists